The McKim Building is the main branch of the Boston Public Library at Copley Square in Boston, Massachusetts. The building, described upon its 1895 opening as a "palace for the people", contains the library's research collection, exhibition rooms, and administrative offices. The building includes lavish decorations, a children's room (the first in the nation), and a central courtyard surrounded by an arcaded gallery in the manner of a Renaissance cloister. The library regularly displays its rare works, often in exhibits that will combine works on paper, rare books, and works of art. Several galleries in the third floor of the McKim building are maintained for exhibits.

History
Boston Public Library was founded in 1852. The first Boston Public Library location opened in 1854 in two rooms in the Adams School on Mason Street. Because the Mason Street space was small and poorly lit, a new building opened at 55 Boylston Street in 1858. It cost $365,000 to build and held 70,000 volumes. By 1880, the Boston Public Library again needed a larger building to accommodate its holdings, and architect Charles Follen McKim of McKim, Mead, and White was chosen to design a new building at the corner of Dartmouth Street and Boylston Street. It opened in 1895 and cost $2.268 million, with a capacity of 2 million books.

Architecture
Charles Follen McKim's design shows influence from a number of architectural precedents. McKim drew explicitly on the Bibliothèque Sainte-Geneviève in Paris (designed by Henri Labrouste, built 1845 to 1851) for the general arrangement of the facade that fronts on Copley Square, but his detailing of that facade's arcaded windows owes a clear debt to the side elevations of Leon Battista Alberti's Tempio Malatestiano in Rimini. The open-air courtyard at the center of the building is based closely on that of the 16th-century Palazzo della Cancelleria in Rome; in its center is a copy of the, once controversial, statue Bacchante and Infant Faun one of the most well-known works by Frederick William Macmonnies. McKim also exploited up-to-date building technology, as the library represents one of the first major applications, in the United States, of the system of thin tile vaults (or catalan vaults) exported from the Mediterranean architectural tradition by the Valencian Rafael Guastavino. Seven different types of Guastavino vaulting can be seen in the library.  Significantly, the ceramic tile patterns are exposed to view on the interior, while all previous projects by Guastavino Sr. covered the vaults with plaster.  

The center entrance consists of three arches flanked by large sconces.  Within each arch are sets of bronze doors by Daniel Chester French added in 1904, which depict left to right, low-relief allegories of Music and Poetry; Knowledge and Wisdom; and Truth and Romance. Beneath the figure of Music is a quote from Arcades by Milton Such sweet compulsion doth in music lie, to lull the daughters of Necessity, And keep unsteady Nature to her law. Beneath Poetry is the inscription True Poetry is Like the Loadstone Which Both Attracts the Needle and Supplies it With Magnetic Power.  The Knowledge door contains a quote from Proverbs 24:3: By knowledge shall the chambers be filled with all pleasant and precious riches; the Wisdom door states There is in Wisdom a spirit subtil, clear in utterance, loving what is good, pure, stedfast.  On the Truth door is the inscription Truth is The Strength and The Kingdom and The Power and the Majesty of all Ages A Romance to Rede and Drive the Night and the Romance door states Away from me thought it Better Play than Either at Chesse or Tables.

Flanking the entry are allegorical representations of Science, to the south and Art, on the north, completed by Bela Pratt in 1912.  On the panels above the arches are seals of Massachusetts, the Library and the city of Boston.

The McKim building was listed on the National Register of Historic Places in 1973, was designated a National Historic Landmark in 1986 for its architectural and historical significance, given Boston Landmark status by the Boston Landmarks Commission in 2000.  It was the first major Beaux Arts building in the United States, and it was also the first large-scale urban library building in the nation.

Murals
Murals include a recently restored mural cycle by John Singer Sargent on the theme of The Triumph of Religion that is considered among the artist's masterworks; Edwin Austin Abbey's most famous work, a series of murals which depict the Grail legend; and paintings of the Muses of Inspiration and allegories of academic subjects by Pierre Puvis de Chavannes. The Puvis murals, which were painted on linen and applied to the library walls using the marouflage technique, are his only murals outside of France.

Monumental inscriptions

McKim chose to have monumental inscriptions, similar to those found on basilicas and monuments in ancient Rome, in the entablature on each of the main building's three façades. On the south is inscribed: "MDCCCLII • FOUNDED THROUGH THE MUNIFICENCE AND PUBLIC SPIRIT OF CITIZENS"; on the east: "THE PUBLIC LIBRARY OF THE CITY OF BOSTON • BUILT BY THE PEOPLE AND DEDICATED TO THE ADVANCEMENT OF LEARNING • A.D. MDCCCLXXXVIII"; and on the north: "THE COMMONWEALTH REQUIRES THE EDUCATION OF THE PEOPLE AS THE SAFEGUARD OF ORDER AND LIBERTY". The last quotation has been attributed to the library's Board of Trustees.

Another inscription, above the keystone of the central entrance, proclaims: "FREE TO ALL". Below each second-story arched window on the three façades are inscribed lists of the names of great historical writers, artists, scientists, philosophers, and statesmen. A document created in 1939 by Frank N. Jones provides a comprehensive list: https://bpl.bibliocommons.com/item/show/1680001075

Across Dartmouth Street from the central entrance is a twentieth-century monument to the Lebanese-born poet and philosopher Gibran Khalil Gibran, or Kahlil Gibran (as he is usually referred to in English) who as a young immigrant educated himself in the Boston Public Library. The monument's inscription responds to the McKim building reading "IT WAS IN MY HEART TO HELP A LITTLE, BECAUSE I WAS HELPED MUCH", an excerpt from a letter enclosed with Gibran's generous bequest to the library.

Bates Hall

Bates Hall is named for the library's first great benefactor, Joshua Bates. Boston Globe writer Sam Allis described "Bates Hall, the great reading room of the BPL, vast and hushed and illuminated with a profusion of green lampshades like fireflies" as one of Boston's "secular spots that are sacred." The form of Bates Hall, rectilinear but terminated with a semi-circular apse on each end, recalls a Roman basilica. A series of robust double coffers in the ceiling provide a sculptural canopy to the room. The east side has a rhythmic series of arched windows with light buffered by wide overhanging hood on the exterior. Heavy deep green silk velvet drapery installed in 1888, and again in the 1920s and 1950s, was not recreated in the 1993 restoration of the room. The drapery helped to muffle sound and lower light levels.

Research collection
Included in the BPL's research collection are more than 1.7 million rare books and manuscripts. It possesses wide-ranging and important holdings, including medieval manuscripts and incunabula, early editions of William Shakespeare (among which are a number of Shakespeare quartos and the First Folio), the George Ticknor collection of Spanish literature, a major collection of Daniel Defoe, records of colonial Boston, the 3,800 volume personal library of John Adams, the mathematical and astronomical library of Nathaniel Bowditch, important manuscript archives on abolitionism, including the papers of William Lloyd Garrison, and a major collection of materials on the Sacco and Vanzetti case. There are large collections of prints, photographs, postcards, and maps. The library, for example, holds one of the major collections of watercolors and drawings by Thomas Rowlandson. The library has a special strength in music, and holds the archives of the Handel and Haydn Society, scores from the estate of Serge Koussevitzky, and the papers of the important American composer Walter Piston.

Image gallery

See also
 List of National Historic Landmarks in Boston
 National Register of Historic Places listings in northern Boston, Massachusetts

Notes

Further reading
 Willis, Catherine J. "Boston Public Library" (Images of America series). Arcadia Publishing, 2011. 
 Small, Herbert (compiler). Handbook of the new Public library in Boston. Boston: Curtis & Co., 1895.
 Peter Wick. A handbook to the art and architecture of the Boston Public Library. 1977.
 Shand-Tucci, Douglass, "Renaissance Rome and Emersonian Boston: Michelangelo and Sargent, between Triumph and Doubt", Anglican Theological Review, Fall 2002, 995-100.
 Ochsendorf, John; Freeman, Michael (Photographer), Guastavino Vaulting: The Art of Structural Tile, Princeton Architectural Press; 1st edition (September 22, 2010).

External links

 The Boston Public Library
 A Tribute to the Boston Public library
 Boston Public Library: architectural images
 Great Buildings on-line
 Photos of the Boston Public Library
 Trustees' McKim Construction Photos The Boston Public Library's McKim Construction Photos on Flickr.com
 City of Boston, Landmarks Commission. Boston Public Library Study Report, 2000

Beaux-Arts architecture in Massachusetts
McKim Building
Public Library, Mckim Building, Boston
Historic district contributing properties in Massachusetts
Public Library, Mckim Building, Boston
Libraries on the National Register of Historic Places in Massachusetts
Library buildings completed in 1895
McKim, Mead & White buildings
National Historic Landmarks in Boston
National Register of Historic Places in Boston
Organizations established in 1848
Public libraries in Massachusetts
1895 establishments in Massachusetts